Memorial Hall is a 1,800-seat multi-purpose arena in Dover, Delaware. It is home to the Delaware State University Hornets men's and women's basketball teams and women's volleyball team.

See also
 List of NCAA Division I basketball arenas

References

College basketball venues in the United States
College volleyball venues in the United States
Basketball venues in Delaware
Buildings and structures in Dover, Delaware
Delaware State Hornets men's basketball
Delaware State Hornets women's basketball